North Scituate Beach is a beach in North Scituate, Massachusetts.

References 

Beaches of Massachusetts
Landforms of Plymouth County, Massachusetts
Scituate, Massachusetts
Tourist attractions in Plymouth County, Massachusetts